The Human Sovereign, otherwise called the Sovereign of Man, was the third Chinese legendary king after Pangu's era. According to Yiwen Leiju, he was the third and last of the Three Sovereigns.

Biography
According to the "Basic Annals of the Three Sovereigns" (三皇本紀) in Sima Zhen’s supplement to the Records of the Grand Historian:

The legends says that he subdivided the land of China into nine provinces, which were united during a 45,600-year dynasty.

See also
Chinese mythology
Three Sovereigns and Five Emperors

References

|-

Three Sovereigns and Five Emperors
Chinese monarchs